T.J. Cinnamons was an American fast food chain specializing in cinnamon rolls.

The company was founded in 1985 by husband and wife, Ted and Joyce Rice. Ted was a cameraman for KCTV Channel 5 and Joyce was a fifth-grade teacher. The first T.J. Cinnamons opened in the Ward Parkway Shopping Center in Kansas City, Missouri, in January 1985. At the time, the cinnamon rolls cost $1.25.

As of 1989 it had more than 230 outlets in the U.S. and Canada, including three shops in Western New York.

In 1996, T.J.Cinnamons was bought by Arby's, which was a subsidiary of Triarc Companies.  In 2011, Triarc Companies (which is now known as The Wendy's Company) sold 81.5% of Arby's to Roark Capital Group, although the T.J. Cinnamons chain remained with the Wendy's Company.  Many Arby's locations continue to feature T.J. Cinnamons despite Roark (through its subsidiary Focus Brands) owning its more well-known rival, Cinnabon.

References

Companies based in Atlanta
Fast-food chains of the United States
Restaurant chains in the United States
American companies established in 1985
Restaurants established in 1985
1985 establishments in Missouri